David McSweeney may refer to:

Dave McSweeney (born 1981), English footballer
David McSweeney (politician) (born 1965), Illinois politician